Dimas Galih Pratama (born 23 November 1992) is an Indonesian professional footballer who plays as a goalkeeper for Liga 2 club Sulut United.

Club career

Kalteng Putra
In 2019, Dimas Galih signed a contract with Indonesian Liga 1 club Kalteng Putra. He made his league debut on 16 May 2019 in a match against PSIS Semarang at the Moch. Soebroto Stadium, Magelang.

Persik Kediri
He was signed for Persik Kediri to play in Liga 1 in the 2020 season. Dimas Galih made his league debut on 29 February 2020 in a match against Persebaya Surabaya at the Gelora Bung Tomo Stadium, Surabaya. This season was suspended on 27 March 2020 due to the COVID-19 pandemic. The season was abandoned and was declared void on 20 January 2021.

Sulut United
In 2021, Dimas Galih signed a contract with Indonesian Liga 2 club Sulut United. He made his league debut on 6 October against Persewar Waropen at the Tuah Pahoe Stadium, Palangka Raya.

Honours

Club
Persebaya Surabaya
 Liga Primer Indonesia: 2011
 Malaysia-Indonesia Unity Cup: 2011
 Indonesia Premier League runner-up: 2011–12
 Liga 2: 2017

References

External links
 
 Dimas Galih Pratama at Liga Indonesia

1992 births
Living people
Sportspeople from Surabaya
Indonesian footballers
Liga 1 (Indonesia) players
Persijap Jepara players
PSM Makassar players
Gresik United players
Association football goalkeepers